Mariko is an impact crater on Venus. In 1997 it was named for a common female Japanese first name, in accordance with planetary nomenclature rules for Venusian craters under 20 km in diameter.

The crater is located in the V-36 quadrangle of Venus.

References

 Dictionary of First Names, by Alfred J. Kolatch; Putnam Publishing Group, New York, 1990.

Impact craters on Venus